Dave Terrell (born February 21, 1931 in Newtown, Pennsylvania, USA) is a retired NASCAR Grand National driver/owner who participated from 1952 to 1957.

Biography
Terrell participated in the 1955 Southern 500. While failing to win a race in his entire career, Terrell managed to get four finishes in the top five and twenty-three finishes in the top ten. 

Out of 8138 laps (5927.4 miles), Terrell managed to lead nine of them.

Most of the races in the Grand National Series in addition to the NASCAR Convertible Series would see him drive in rides that he owned personally.

References

1931 births
Living people
NASCAR drivers
NASCAR team owners
People from Bucks County, Pennsylvania
Racing drivers from Pennsylvania